Kohima Komets (known simply as KKFC) are an Indian professional football club based in district of Kohima, Nagaland. The club was established in 2011. The has participated in the I-League 2nd Division (3rd tier of National leagues pyramid) and Nagaland Premier League.

History
The Kohima Komets Football Club (KKFC) was established in the year of 2011. The club has participated in I-League 2nd Division held in 2018–19 & the Nagaland Premier League. The Kohima Komets play at the 20,000-capacity Local Ground in Kohima, which is used mostly for football matches.

Kit manufacturers and shirt sponsors

Current squad

First team squad

Head coaching record
updated on 28 May 2017

External links
 Official Facebook Page

References

Nagaland Premier League
2012–13 in Indian football
Kohima
Football clubs in Nagaland
2011 establishments in Nagaland
Association football clubs established in 2011
I-League 2nd Division clubs